Union Sportive Bressane is a general sports club based in the town of Bourg-en-Bresse, France. The club has competed for the past few years in France's third division, Nationale. During the 2007–08 season, they managed to reach the final of the Jean-Prat championship and faced a surging US Colomiers side. US Bressane was easily defeated 36-3, but thanks to reaching the final this still earned the club automatic promotion to the second division of France, Rugby Pro D2 for 2008-09.

Current standings

Current squad

The Bourg-en-Bresse squad for the 2021–22 season is:

See also

 List of rugby union clubs in France
 Rugby union in France

References

External links
  Union Sportive Bressane Official website
  itsrugby.fr US Bressane

Bressane
Rugby clubs established in 1902
Sport in Ain